Readyville [] is an unincorporated community located primarily in Cannon County, Tennessee, United States and secondarily in Rutherford County, Tennessee, United States. It lies approximately halfway between Murfreesboro and Woodbury with an assigned zip code of 37149.

History
The community was founded by and named for Colonel Charles Ready, an early settler who arrived in the area in 1802. In 1811, Ready established the first community post office, currently located in Rutherford County. The following year, while mayor of Murfreesboro, he constructed the Readyville Mill on the east fork of Stones River in Cannon County. The mill was destroyed in a fire of unknown origin during the American Civil War, rebuilt in the 1870s, and added to the National Register of Historic Places on June 12, 1973. The mill is under private ownership and is currently closed to the public after having been opened in 2009 for full-service restaurant meals and self-guided tours.

Colonel Charles Ready's son, also named Charles Ready, was born in Readyville in 1802, elected to the Tennessee House of Representatives in 1835, and elected to the United States House of Representatives for Tennessee's 5th congressional district in 1853. Their former home, the Charles Ready House, is located in Cannon County, directly on the Rutherford County border across from the post office. The house was added to the National Register of Historic Places on July 2, 1973. The house is currently under private ownership, formerly available to the public as a bed and breakfast and multipurpose venue.

Readyville is also home to the Uncle Dave Macon House, located in Rutherford County, purchased by Grand Ole Opry star Uncle Dave Macon in 1900, and added to the National Register of Historic Places on November 15, 1973. The house is currently under private ownership. It is also claimed by the unincorporated community of Kittrell but has a Readyville mailing address. Pilot Knob, Readyville's notable landmark that rises about 600 feet in elevation from its base, is referenced in the Uncle Dave Macon song "The Fox Chase" and is viewable from the Uncle Dave Macon House. Pilot Knob is privately owned, and trespassing is explicitly prohibited.

Two racially segregated schools were once in operation in the community during the twentieth century but are no longer standing. Construction on John Bragg Highway, which provides a direct connection between Murfreesboro and Woodbury while circumventing the central portion of Readyville, was completed in approximately 1992. The only way to travel between the two much larger cities by automobile in prior years was to pass through the heart of the community. As this is no longer necessary, traffic through the center of Readyville has dropped significantly.

The community's only confirmed tornado touchdown happened on April 10, 2009, at 12:19 p.m. An F0 tornado was on the ground for 0.8 miles while it moved east across Locke Creek Rd, which lies to the east of the downtown area. Light storm damage also occurred during an unconfirmed F0 tornado touchdown on September 24, 2018.

Landmarks
In addition to the Readyville Mill, Post Office, Charles Ready House, and Uncle Dave Macon House (which lies about five miles to the southwest), the community currently has a market, barber, florist, lumber yard, upholstery shop, and photography studio near the downtown area. Several churches and cemeteries, notably absent from the center, can be found in the surrounding areas. Readyville's most noticeable landmark, Pilot Knob, can be spotted from several miles away.

Photo Gallery

References

Unincorporated communities in Cannon County, Tennessee
Unincorporated communities in Tennessee